The Julius H. Barnes Points Trophy is a trophy originally awarded by the National Association of Amateur Oarsmen to the winning club of their national championship regatta. The trophy was first awarded in 1916 at the regatta held in Duluth. It was valued at $4,000, . It is named after a wealthy grain exporter who bankrolled the regatta. The scoring system was designed to be similar to that of the Lipton Cup, a trophy for sailing. As of 2017, the United States Rowing Association, successor to the NAAO, has the original Barnes trophy in their possession and occasionally displays it at events.

The USRA continues to award a "Sulgar-Barnes Men's Points Trophy" at their National Championships Regatta to the club with the most points in men's events. The scoring system used by the USRA for the Sulgar-Barnes trophy and other points trophies is as follows. Identical or similar systems, often referred to as "Barnes scoring," are used in many American regattas.

References

Rowing trophies and awards
Rowing in the United States
American sports trophies and awards
Sports trophies and awards